S/2004 S 17 is a natural satellite of Saturn. Its discovery was announced by Scott S. Sheppard, David C. Jewitt, Jan Kleyna, and Brian G. Marsden on 4 May 2005 from observations taken between 13 December 2004 and 5 March 2005.

S/2004 S 17 is about 4 kilometres in diameter, and orbits Saturn at an average distance of 19,847,000 kilometres in about 1,044 days, at an inclination of 168.1° to the ecliptic, in a retrograde direction and with an eccentricity of 0.165.

This moon was considered lost until its recovery was announced on 12 October 2022.

References 

 Institute for Astronomy Saturn Satellite Data
 Jewitt's New Satellites of Saturn page
 MPEC 2005-J13: Twelve New Satellites of Saturn, 3 May 2005 (discovery and ephemeris)

Norse group
Moons of Saturn
Irregular satellites
Discoveries by Scott S. Sheppard
Astronomical objects discovered in 2005
Moons with a retrograde orbit